Jayendrabhā or Jayaendra[valla]bha (8th-century - 9th-century), was a queen regnant of Sambhupura Chenla in Cambodia.

She was the daughter of queen Nṛpatendradevī or Nrpendradevi of Sambhupura. She appears to have inherited the throne from her mother.  She married king Jayavarman II (r. 780-824). 

Her daughter queen Jyeṣṭhāryā succeeded her on the throne by 803.

References

Cambodian Hindus
8th-century Cambodian monarchs
8th-century women rulers
9th-century women rulers
9th-century Cambodian women
8th-century Cambodian women
Chenla